Sir Alan Sterling Parkes FRS CBE (10 September 1900 – 17 July 1990) was an English reproductive biologist credited with Christopher Polge and Audrey Smith for the discovery that spermatozoa can be protected against induced damage induced by freezing and low-temperature storage using glycerol. This work enabled the development of the field of cryobiology.

Hall was educated at Willaston School.

He published on the reproductive effects of X-rays on mice, hormonal control of secondary sexual characteristics in birds, and aided Hilda Bruce in research that established the Bruce effect.

In 1962, Parkes was awarded the Cameron Prize for Therapeutics of the University of Edinburgh.

References 

1900 births
1990 deaths